Gonia is a genus of flies in the family Tachinidae.

Species
G. albagenae Morrison, 1940
G. aldrichi Tothill, 1924
G. asiatica (Rohdendorf, 1928)
G. atra Meigen, 1826
G. aturgida Brooks, 1944
G. bimaculata Wiedemann, 1819
G. breviforceps Tothill, 1924
G. brevipulvilli Tothill, 1924
G. capitata (De Geer, 1776)
G. carinata Tothill, 1924
G. chilonis Walker, 1849
G. chinensis Wiedemann, 1824
G. contumax Brooks, 1944
G. crassicornis (Fabricius, 1794)
G. desertorum (Rohdendorf, 1928)
G. distincta Smith, 1915
G. distinguenda Herting, 1963
G. divisa Meigen, 1826
G. foersteri Meigen, 1838
G. frontosa Say, 1829
G. fuscicollis Tothill, 1924
G. kalimpongensis (Das, 1993)
G. klapperichi (Mesnil, 1956)
G. longiforceps Tothill, 1924
G. longipulvilli Tothill, 1924
G. maculipennis Egger, 1862
G. nana Becker, 1908
G. nanshanica (Rohdendorf, 1928)
G. nigra (Brooks, 1944)
G. occidentalis Brooks, 1944
G. olgae (Rohdendorf, 1927)
G. ornata Meigen, 1826
G. picea (Robineau-Desvoidy, 1830)
G. pilosa Brooks, 1944
G. porca Williston, 1887
G. quadrisetosa Becker, 1908
G. reinhardi Brooks, 1944
G. robusta Brooks, 1944
G. sagax Townsend, 1892
G. senilis Williston, 1887
G. sequax Williston, 1887
G. setifacies (Brooks, 1944)
G. setigera Tothill, 1924
G. smithi Brooks, 1944
G. turgida Coquillett, 1897
G. umbripennis Herting, 1958
G. ussuriensis (Rohdendorf, 1928)
G. vacua Meigen, 1826

References

Diptera of North America
Diptera of Europe
Diptera of Asia
Exoristinae
Taxa named by Johann Wilhelm Meigen
Tachinidae genera